Clypeola is a plant genus in the family Brassicaceae.

Species
 Clypeola aspera
 Clypeola ciliata
 Clypeola cyclodontea
 Clypeola dichotoma
 Clypeola elegans
 Clypeola eriocarpa
 Clypeola jonthlaspi
 Clypeola lappacea
 Clypeola raddeana

References

External links

Brassicaceae
Brassicaceae genera